FC Van Yerevan, is a defunct Armenian football club from the capital Yerevan, founded in 1990.

History
This club is named in honor of the Armenian historic city of Van, which was once the capital of the Urartu Kingdom. The club participated in the first Armenian soccer championship, which took fifth place overall. During the six seasons the club has always participated in the Premier League. The team has strong problems, and the place occupied by the team were in the range from 5th to 10th position. But so,  the club was disbanded in 1997 at the end of the championship.

League Record

Coaching history

  Azad Mangasarian (1992)
  Arsen Chilingaryan (1992–1993)
  Edward Asoyan (1993–1995)
  Varuzhan Sukiasyan (1995)
  Levon Hakobyan (1996)
  Ashot Khachatryan (1996–1997)

External links
Profile on klisf.info 
Profile on weltfussballarchiv.com 
RSSSF Armenia (and subpages per year)
Profile on foot.dk  

FC Van Yerevan
Defunct football clubs in Armenia
Association football clubs established in 1990
Association football clubs disestablished in 1997
Football clubs in Yerevan
1990 establishments in Armenia
1997 disestablishments in Armenia